Air Marshal Andrew Mark Turner,  (born 1967) is a former senior Royal Air Force officer and helicopter pilot.

Early life and education
Born in 1967, Turner was educated at Kingswood School. He studied at the University of Oxford, University of Exeter, King's College London, Chennai and the Open University: he has a Bachelor of Arts (BA) degree in oceanography and cosmology, a master's degree in international relations, and a master's degree in strategic studies.

RAF career
Turner joined the Royal Air Force in 1985 and was commissioned as an acting pilot officer in 1986, initially training at RAF Gütersloh. He was promoted to pilot officer in 1987, and further promoted to flying officer in 1987, flight lieutenant in 1991, squadron leader in 1995, and wing commander in 2000. He was appointed an Officer of the Order of the British Empire in 2003 in recognition of service in the Iraq War also referred to as Operation Telic.

Turner has commanded No. 28 Squadron RAF and RAF Odiham.  In July 2014 he went on to be Air Officer Commanding No. 22 Group RAF and Chief of Staff Training at RAF Air Command, in which capacity he also oversaw safety for the Red Arrows. He was Assistant Chief of the Defence Staff (Operations) from October 2017 to 2019. Turner was promoted to air marshal and appointed as Deputy Commander Capability at RAF Air Command on 23 May 2019.

Turner was appointed as a Commander of the Order of the British Empire in the 2010 New Year Honours, and  further appointed a Companion of the Order of the Bath in the 2019 New Year Honours.

In February 2022 Turner was temporarily suspended after complaints from neighbours who told police they had seen him naked in his garden. He was not arrested or charged.

References

1967 births
20th-century Royal Air Force personnel
21st-century Royal Air Force personnel
British military personnel of The Troubles (Northern Ireland)
Commanders of the Order of the British Empire
Companions of the Order of the Bath
Helicopter pilots
Living people
Royal Air Force personnel of the Gulf War
Royal Air Force personnel of the Iraq War
Royal Air Force personnel of the War in Afghanistan (2001–2021)
People educated at Kingswood School, Bath
Alumni of the University of Oxford
Alumni of the University of Exeter
Alumni of King's College London
Alumni of the Open University